Megaphragma caribea is a species of wasp. It has been found acting as an egg parasitoid of Heliothrips haemorrhoidalis and Selenothrips rubrocinctus, which live on the plant Terminalia catappa in Columbia. It has a body length of only 181–224 μm.

References

Trichogrammatidae
Insects described in 1993